ADP-ribose pyrophosphatase, mitochondrial is an enzyme that in humans is encoded by the NUDT9 gene.

References

Further reading

Nudix hydrolases